Agence nationale de l'aviation civile (ANAC Congo) is the civil aviation authority of the Republic of the Congo, headquartered in Camp Clairon in Brazzaville.

It was created in 1978. As of 2015 the director is Serge Florent Dzota.

References

External links
  Agence nationale de l'aviation civile
Congo
Civil aviation in the Republic of the Congo
Government of the Republic of the Congo
Organizations established in 1978
Transport organisations based in the Republic of the Congo
1978 establishments in the Republic of the Congo